Ethylparaben (ethyl para-hydroxybenzoate) is the ethyl ester of p-hydroxybenzoic acid. Its formula is HO-C6H4-CO-O-CH2CH3. It is a member of the class of compounds known as parabens.

It is used as an antifungal preservative. As a food additive, it has E number E214.

Sodium ethyl para-hydroxybenzoate, the sodium salt of ethylparaben, has the same uses and is given the E number E215.

References

Ethyl esters
E-number additives
Parabens